Percival Clarence Best (21 March 1873 – 14 April 1943) was an Australian politician. Born in Westbury, Tasmania, he was elected to the Tasmanian House of Assembly for Wilmot in 1928, representing the Nationalist Party. Defeated in 1931, he returned to politics in 1935 as the Independent member for the Legislative Council seat of Meander, which he held until his death in Hobart in 1943. His son Charles was also an MLC from 1958 to 1971.

References

1873 births
1943 deaths
People from Westbury, Tasmania
Nationalist Party of Australia members of the Parliament of Tasmania
Independent members of the Parliament of Tasmania
Members of the Tasmanian House of Assembly
Members of the Tasmanian Legislative Council
20th-century Australian politicians